The 2021–22 Women's FIH Pro League was the third edition of the Women's FIH Pro League, a field hockey championship for women's national teams. The tournament started in October 2021 and finished in June 2022.

Format
The home and away principle was kept but this principle was split over two consecutive seasons onwards and worked according to the following example:
in previous season 2020–21, Team A hosted Team B twice within a couple of days.
in current season 2021–22, Team B hosted Team A twice within a couple of days.
If one of the two matches played between two teams was cancelled, the winner of the other match would have received double points.

Teams
Originally, nine teams were scheduled to compete in a round-robin tournament, being played from October 2021 to June 2022. On 17 September 2021, both, New Zealand and Australia, withdrew due to the COVID-19 pandemic and the travel restrictions coming with it. On 8 October 2021, the FIH announced that India and Spain were the replacements.

Squads

Results

Standings

Fixtures
All times are local.

Goalscorers

See also
2021–22 Men's FIH Pro League

Notes

References

External links

Women's FIH Pro League
FIH Pro League
FIH Pro League